Nathmal Pahalwan also known as  Nathu Pahalwan, Nathmal Pareek and Nathmal Kathotia (1911–2006) was a professional wrestler and a community activist from Calcutta, India.  He was the founder of  Ganga Seva Samiti Ghat and the wrestling arena in Calcutta, India.  He was popularly known as Guruji (Master Teacher) and Pahalwanji (Wrestler in Hindi) by his close friends and disciples.

Guruji's dedication and persistent efforts inspired his close friends and disciples to support the holy mission of building a safe ghat for people to worship in the river Ganges and offer prayers at the nearby temples.  In English- and/or Hindi-speaking areas 'ghats' refers to the areas, in the holy river-side cities like Haridwar, Varanasi, Calcutta - where there is a stairway to access the Ganges River.  People take a holy dip and shower in the river.

History
During the early to mid-1900s, in India, wrestling took place in clay or dirt pit. The soil is mixed with milk and ghee (pasteurized butter) and is then softened before each practice.  Many other things like camphor are added to make sure that the wrestlers do not get any infections.  Traditional Indian wrestling is not just a sport - it is an ancient subculture where wrestlers live and train together and follow strict rules on everything from what they can eat to what they can do in their spare time. Drinking and smoking are off limits. The focus is on living a pure life, building strength and honing their wrestling skills.

Championships and accomplishments
Guruji was from the small village Bambu near the village Sandwa in Churu district of Rajasthan, India. Due to his good physique and height of 6 feet and 3 inches, he was encouraged to study Pehlwani, an Indian style of wrestling, in the milked sand wrestling pits of India called akhara. He was a favorite in most wrestling tournaments in India due to his big frame and amazing upper body strength. He wrestled on invitation of kings of various Indian princely states. He successfully competed against some of the greatest names in wrestling history and professional wrestlers from the United States.

During the primer of his professional career, Guruji won many wrestling contests in greater India, traveled to Kathmandu, Nepal and Rangoon, Burma to wrestle against his contemporary renowned European wrestlers.  He was one of the top wrestlers in Shri Ganga Singhji's (then king of Bikaner) kingdom in Bikaner, Rajasthan, India and was conferred with numerous awards.  During his stay in Bikaner, he founded and trained at "Maruthi Vyayamshala", a local gymnasium. He led the Indian wrestling team to Burma and was victorious in the championship.  The city of Bikaner celebrated after he returned from Burma.  He was billed as one of the greatest Pehlwani wrestlers in the history of Greco-Roman wrestling.  He had some legendary battles with Stanislaus Zbyszko and Gama Pahalwan.  After his battles he was awarded the prestigious title of Hind Kesari.

Guruji was also conferred upon the title of The Lion of Rajputana in Agra (1936 A.D) by Lady Lin-lithgow (wife of then Viceroy of India - Lord Lin-lithgow) on winning a double wrestling contest (two wrestling bouts in a day).  Guruji was also instrumental in training young wrestlers and having cordial relations with a number of "akhadas" (wrestling arenas) including, Bikaner, Calcutta, and several cities of Uttar Pradesh, Bihar and Madhya Pradesh.  Guruji was instrumental in training Dara Singh, when he trained with him for a brief time in Kolkota.  He had cordial relations with Guru Hanuman and Dara Singh.

He held his wrestling and spiritual gurus (teachers) in great esteem and was always grateful to them for their advice.  His wrestling prowess has been discussed in many Indian national dailies like "The Telegraph" and "The Statemaan", published from Calcutta, "Rajasthan Patrika", published from Jaipur.

Diet and Workouts
Guruji was not only a renowned wrestler of his time, winning a number of prestigious titles but was a great philanthropist too. He firmly believed Shareer madhyam khalu dharma sadhanam, meaning - It is through a healthy body alone that one will be able to serve God and Society.  His daily morning routine included: Waking up by 4 am, going to the shore of the Ganges, exercise by doing thousand repetitions (reps) of squats (baithak) and push-ups (dand).  After that he would do wrestling with other wrestlers & train the new wrestlers and swim for over an hour.

His daily training consisted of grappling with over ten of his fellow wrestlers in the akhada. He did a minimum of one thousand baithaks (Indian word for squats) and one thousand dands (Indian word for pushups) every day.  His purely vegetarian diet included:

 4–5 litres of milk per day mixed with a pound of crushed almond paste
 Half litre of ghee (pasteurized butter)
 Two pounds of butter
 A healthy serving of seasonal fruits or fruit juices
 and other healthy ingredients to promote his digestive system and muscular health

He had built such great stamina with his 3-4-hour daily workout, that many times he could swim across the Hooghly river, a distance of 0.75 km (0.5-mile) with relative ease.  His daily regimen included an hour of swimming, wrestling with multiple wrestlers and teaching them the art of wrestling.

Community service
After he retired from wrestling, he was instrumental in the establishment and development of a number of temples and community centers across India.  He was also one of the founders and the President of Pareek Samaj in Kolkata for many years.

Some of the community centers founded by him include: Bara Bazar Yuvak Sangh, Calcutta - founded in 1939, Maruti Vyayam Mandir, Bikaner - founded in 1946 and Ganga Seva Samiti Ghat, Calcutta - founded in 1945.

Ved Mata Gayatri and Shiv Temple, Liluah, Pareek Bhavan, Calcutta, Sita Ram Mandir/Bhavan, Sandwa, Rajasthan and Shiva Temple in Bammu, Rajasthan were some of the temples he set up.

He was a very active social worker and encouraged, personally donated large sums of money to the welfare of the poor, down-trodden and convinced the wealthy to donate to the charities and help the communities.

Guruji's family
Guruji died when was 95 years old, peacefully in 2006 in Calcutta after a brief illness.  He was a symbol of strength and saintliness and is revered among the people from all walks of life.  He visited all over India, the US and UK and enjoyed a great family life.  He is survived by two sons and a daughter.

Though Wrestling in traditional clay pits is on the decline over the last few decades, but there are still many akharas left, thanks to dedicated people like Guruji, who worked to keep this ancient part of Indian culture alive.  The akharas and mud based wrestling were one of themes of a recent Aamir Khan based Hindi movie - "Dangal" & Salman Khan Hindi movie "Sultan".  People were mesmerized to re-live the ancient art of wrestling.  Thanks to his efforts, this ancient art is still alive and practiced with great vigor in many parts of India.

On Friday, 17 September 2010, a statue  of Guruji was unveiled at Ganga Seva Samithi, Calcutta to commemorate his life and his achievements.  It was attended by his family, friends, a number of political leaders and social workers, who looked upon Guruji as their role model.  The statue is visited by thousands of tourists, who come to visit Calcutta.  People offer their prayers at nearby temple and offer flower garlands to Guruji.  His stories and legacy are discussed even to this day.

See also
 Pehlwani
 Catch wrestling
 Bholu Pahalwan
 Dara Singh
 Professional wrestling
 Premchand Dogra

References

 
 

 An article published in Rajasthan Patrika, Bikaner, India - 7 Feb 2020

1911 births
2006 deaths
Indian wrestlers
People associated with physical culture
People from Churu district
Sport wrestlers from Kolkata